Library is a station on Pittsburgh Regional Transit's light rail network, located in the Library neighborhood of South Park, Pennsylvania. It is the southern terminus of the Silver Line (formerly the Library branch of the Blue Line). A 430 space park and ride lot is located on the premises, drawing travelers from both South Park and Pittsburgh's suburbs in Washington County, located just to the south.  The station is named for the Library neighborhood in which it resides, despite the name, no lending library is near the station.

History
The Pittsburgh Railways interurban line from Charleroi to Pittsburgh was opened through South Park on September 12, 1903, with passengers changing at Castle Shannon to continue their journey to Downtown via the Pittsburgh and Castle Shannon Railroad.  At this time, the Simmons stop was established to serve Library.  In 1953, the interurban line was abandoned and cut back to Library, with a turnaround loop built at Simmons for the single-ended PCC's that operated on the line.  In the late 1980s, new light rail vehicles began to use the line.  These new cars had larger, articulated bodies, and were thus unable to negotiate the loop.  Moreover, these cars were double-ended, eliminating the need for such turn-around facilities.  In 2004, the loop was removed and a new, larger station was built to better accommodate the light rail cars.

References

External links 

Port Authority T Stations Listings
Station from Google Maps Street View

Port Authority of Allegheny County stations
Railway stations in the United States opened in 1953
Silver Line (Pittsburgh)